Terebratalia transversa is a species of brachiopod in the family Terebrataliidae.

Its larval features include the apical organ, apical cilary tuft and bands of ciliated sections. The features of the apical organ suggest an evolutionary reconstruction of brains commonly seen in bilaterians.

References

Terebratulida
Animals described in 1846